John Herbert Sharp ( – ) was a British actor who made numerous appearances on television during a career spanning 42 years.

Biography
Sharp made more than 130 appearances in television and occasionally films between 1949 and 1991. Although active in theatre, Sharp began as a film actor in 1949 and appeared in films throughout the 1950s. By the mid-1960s he mostly appeared in British television on popular shows of the era such as The Avengers "Murdersville" episode, the Randall and Hopkirk (Deceased) episode "The Ghost Who Saved the Bank at Monte Carlo"; The Prisoner, Not on Your Nellie opposite Hylda Baker, Z-Cars, and in 1976 in The Sweeney episode "On the Run" in which he played Uncle, a homosexual retired Magistrate who becomes embroiled in the escape of a psychopathic prisoner having befriended the prisoner's former accomplice. He performed in Charles Dickens TV adaptations in the 1980s. In 1991, he made his last television appearance in the programme Lovejoy. He played the role of the "apparently cynical" Uncle Will in Luigi Comencini's 1966 Incompreso.

Sharp's most notable television appearances in a recurring role was on the All Creatures Great and Small television series, in which he portrayed Ezra Biggins, an aged, parsimonious and awkward Yorkshire dairy farmer. "John Sharp was just like you see him," recalled Peter Davison, who played Tristan Farnon in the series. "He was a wonderful raconteur and would tell you these long stories." Christopher Timothy, who played the leading role of James Herriot, added: "I found myself getting quite moved when I watched an episode recently, not because of what we were doing, but because all those lovely people are no longer with us. John Sharp was a lovely, lovely man."

Selected filmography

 Dr. Morelle: The Case of the Missing Heiress (1949) 
 Celia (1949) – Mr. Haldane
 Diamond City (1949) – Reader (uncredited)
 Your Witness (1950) – Police Constable Hawkins
 Night and the City (1950) – Man (uncredited)
 A Case for PC 49 (1951) – Desk Sergeant
 Angels One Five (1952) – 'Soss'
 The House Across the Lake (1954) – Mr. Hardcastle
 Child's Play (1954) – Police Sgt. Butler
 Left Right and Centre (1959) – Mr. Reeves
 No Love for Johnnie (1961) – Railway Station Master (uncredited)
 The Golden Rabbit (1962) – Peebles
 Stork Talk (1962) – Papa Pierre
 A Jolly Bad Fellow (1964) – Hodges
 Bunny Lake Is Missing (1965) – Finger Print Man
 Take a Pair of Private Eyes (1966) – Crozier
 Misunderstood (1967) – Uncle William 'Will'
 Three Bites of the Apple (1967) – Joe Batterfly
 The White Bus (1967) – Macebearer
 Mrs. Brown, You've Got a Lovely Daughter (1968) – Oakshot
 Spring and Port Wine (1970) – Bowler 4
 Brother Sun, Sister Moon (1972) – Bishop Guido
 That's Your Funeral (1972) – Mayor
 Shabby Tiger (1973) Piggy White (5 episodes)
 And Now the Screaming Starts! (1973) – Henry's friend
 The Wicker Man (1973) – Doctor Ewan
 Watch Out, We're Mad (1974) – The Boss
 Galileo (1975) – Monk Official
 Barry Lyndon (1975) – Doolan
 Robin's Nest (1976) – Butcher
 Jabberwocky (1977) – Sergeant at Gate
 Velvet Hands (1979) – Benny
 The Quiz Kid (1979) – Stanwell
 The Fiendish Plot of Dr. Fu Manchu (1980) – Sir Nules Thudd
 The Bunker (1981) – Dr. Morell
 The Return of the Soldier (1982) – Pearson
 The Dresser (1983) – Mr. Bottomley
 Top Secret! (1984) – Maitre D'
 A Christmas Carol (1984) – Tipton
 The Bride (1985) – Bailiff
 That Summer of White Roses (1989) – Gradonacelnik / The Mayor
 Lovejoy

References

External links

English male stage actors
English male film actors
English male television actors
Male actors from Bradford
1920 births
1992 deaths
20th-century English male actors